Albert Hulzebosch (born 7 July 1949) is a Dutch racing cyclist. He rode in the 1974 Tour de France.

References

1949 births
Living people
Dutch male cyclists
Place of birth missing (living people)